The 1949–50 Philadelphia Warriors season was the fourth season for the team in the National Basketball Association (NBA).

NBA Draft

Roster

|-
! colspan="2" style="background-color: #003399;  color: #FFCC33; text-align: center;" | Philadelphia Warriors 1949–50 roster
|- style="background-color: #FFCC33; color: #003399;   text-align: center;"
! Players !! Coaches
|-
| valign="top" |

! Pos. !! # !! Nat. !! Name !! Ht. !! Wt. !! From
|-

Regular season

Season standings

Record vs. opponents

Game log

Playoffs

|- align="center" bgcolor="#ffcccc"
| 1
| March 22
| @ Syracuse
| L 76–93
| Chink Crossin (20)
| Al Guokas (4)
| State Fair Coliseum
| 0–1
|- align="center" bgcolor="#ffcccc"
| 2
| March 23
| Syracuse
| L 53–59
| Vern Gardner (17)
| Leo Mogus (4)
| Philadelphia Arena
| 0–2
|-

References

Golden State Warriors seasons
Philadelphia